Vitaliy Sidnyov (10 September 1948) is a former professional Soviet football defender and later Soviet and Ukrainian coach.

References

External links
 
 Player's profile. Odessa Football.

1948 births
1993 deaths
Footballers from Chișinău
Moldavian Jews
Soviet footballers
SKA Odesa players
FC Chornomorets Odesa players
FC Elektrometalurh-NZF Nikopol players
FC Dnister Ovidiopol players
Soviet Top League players
Soviet football managers
Ukrainian football managers
FC Chornomorets-2 Odesa managers
Association football defenders